The following are  lists of European Athletics Indoor Championships medalists:

List of European Athletics Indoor Championships medalists (men)
List of European Athletics Indoor Championships medalists (women)